Columbia Memorial Hospital (CMH) is a 25-bed medical facility in Astoria, Oregon. It is affiliated with the Evangelical Lutheran Church in America, Oregon Synod. The hospital has been serving families living and visiting the North Coast and Lower Columbia Region since 1880. A critical access hospital, its services include a level IV trauma center.

History
The start of the hospital came in 1880, when the Sisters of Providence founded St. Mary's Hospital in Astoria. It was the region's first and only hospital until the early 1900s. In 1919, the Finnish community started to raise money for a second hospital in Astoria, Columbia Hospital. The Finnish community was unable to raise enough funds, so the Lutheran Church's Augustana synod took over the fundraising. The hospital opened in 1927, located on 16th Street at Franklin Avenue. In 1958, operation of the hospital was taken over by a new corporation named Columbia Lutheran Charities, replacing the Augustana Lutheran Church. By at least 1970, the facility had been renamed Columbia Memorial Hospital.

In 1970, Columbia Lutheran Charities, by this time the hospital's owner, bought St. Mary's Hospital, which had been the first such facility in the city when it opened in 1880. At the time of this acquisition, that older hospital was located at 16th and Duane streets in a building constructed in 1931 adjacent to a 1905 building that replaced the original structure. The wood-frame 1905 building had already been out of use for several years.

In 1975, the hospital started a fundraising drive to provide funds for a new facility to replace the nearly 50-year-old existing buildings. Plans for the new $4.7 million facility were approved by the Oregon Health Commission in December 1975. In December 1977, the new hospital opened, replacing both the original Columbia Hospital and the former St. Mary's Hospital building. The old building at 16th and Franklin was turned into a nursing home and still stands today. The St. Mary's Hospital buildings, dating from 1905 and 1931, were demolished in 1975, as the plans for a new facility were advancing.

CMH underwent a $2 million renovation and expansion in the late 1990s. In 2013, it opened an urgent care and primary care clinic in nearby Warrenton, Oregon.

The hospital announced a new cancer clinic in Astoria to be operated jointly with Oregon Health & Science University in May 2015. The CMH-OHSU Knight Cancer Collaborative opened in October 2017 and offers comprehensive community cancer treatment for radiation oncology, medical oncology and infusion services for adult patients in the Columbia-Pacific region of Northwest Oregon and Southwest Washington.

One year later, in October 2018, CMH opened the Astoria Primary Care Clinic with five providers to meet the primary care needs of the community. CMH will also be opening a Seaside facility, which will include an urgent care and multi-specialty clinic, in January 2020.

Details
CMH is a critical-access hospital that is licensed for 49 beds, but as of 2014 only had 25 beds available. Services at the facility include a level IV trauma center. Other services include hospice care, cardiac services, imaging, a laboratory, maternity, pharmacy, surgical and urgent care, among other services. The hospital sits on a campus just off U.S. Route 30 at 21st Street and includes a helipad.

CMH is the fastest growing rural hospital in the state of Oregon. It is one of only five remaining independent hospitals in the state.

See also
List of hospitals in Oregon

References

1927 establishments in Oregon
Hospitals in Oregon
Buildings and structures in Astoria, Oregon